|}

The Coral Marathon is a Listed flat horse race in Great Britain open to horses aged four years and over.
It is run at Sandown over a distance of 2 mile and 50 yards (3,264 metres), and it is scheduled to take place each year in July.

The race was first run in 2003 and is registered as the Esher Stakes. It takes place at the same meeting as Sandown Park's most prestigious and valuable flat race, the Eclipse Stakes.

Winners

See also
 Horse racing in Great Britain
 List of British flat horse races

References

Racing Post:

Open long distance horse races
Sandown Park Racecourse
Flat races in Great Britain
Recurring sporting events established in 2003
2003 establishments in England